Véronique Joumard (born 1964 in Grenoble) is a French artist.

Early life 
Véronique Joumard was born in Grenoble, France in 1964. She studying at the École supérieure d'Art de Grenoble. She began her career as an artist in 1987 with an exhibition at the Villa Arson in Nice.

Work 
Joumard is a photographer, a sculptor and an installation artist. Most of her projects are in relation with light and interact with the exhibition space.

Joumard has participated in exhibitions in art centres, museums and galleries in France and abroad. Her work has been shown in exhibitions at the Setouchi Triennale in Takamatsu Japan, the Kunsthaus Baselland in Muttenz, Switzerland, the Mudam in Luxembourg, the Credac in Ivry-sur-Seine France, among others. She has completed several public commissions in France, Italy and Japan.

Bibliography 

 Véronique Joumard œuvres 1985-1998, Dijon : Le Consortium, 1998, 
 Véronique Journard, Dijon : Les presse du réel, 2010,

References

External links 

 Véronique Joumard in the Archives of Women Artists (Aware)
 Véronique Joumard portrait by Pascale Cassagnau for Archives de la critique d’art

1964 births
Living people
French contemporary artists
20th-century French artists
21st-century French women artists
Women installation artists
20th-century French women